Dwyer is an unincorporated community in Platte County, Wyoming, United States.

Notes

Unincorporated communities in Platte County, Wyoming
Unincorporated communities in Wyoming